Hakha Township is a township of Hakha District in the Chin State of Burma. It surrounds the city of Hakha, the state capital. It became part of Falam District until Hakha District was formed by the first Chin State Hluttaw emergency meeting No. 2/2012 on 1 June 2012.

Demographics

2014

The 2014 Myanmar Census reported that Hakha Township had a population of 48,352. The population density was 11.6 people per km2. The census reported that the median age was 23.2 years, and 91 males per 100 females. There were 9,917 households; the mean household size was 4.7.

References

Townships of Chin State